The Pensions (Increase) Act 1947 was an Act of the Parliament of the United Kingdom. It was passed during the Labour government of Clement Attlee. It substantially raised the benefit rates for pensioners.

Notes

United Kingdom Acts of Parliament 1947
Social security in the United Kingdom